Carmen Kass (born 14 September 1978) is an Estonian model and former political candidate. She has worked as the face of brands such as Chanel, Versace, Yves Saint Laurent, Gucci, Valentino, Calvin Klein, Ralph Lauren, Christian Dior, Givenchy, and, for ten consecutive years, Michael Kors. The American edition of Vogue declared her and Gisele Bündchen the two supermodels of the era on its January 2000 cover.

Outside of modeling, Kass ran for the European Parliament in 2004 and was the president of the Estonian Chess Federation from 2004 to 2011.

Early life
Kass was born in Tallinn and grew up in the village of Mäo, near Paide, Järva County. Kass, her elder sister Victoria and elder brother Kutty were raised by their mother, Koidu Põder. Her father, Viktor Kass, was a chess teacher in Põlva.

Career

Modeling
When Kass was 14 years-old, she was discovered in a supermarket by a model scout from Milan. Her first venture into the modeling world was unsuccessful, and Kass left Milan after a short time.

Kass then moved to Paris at the age of eighteen. She soon received exposure by appearing on the covers of American, French, British, and Italian Vogue, Australian Elle, UK Image, Madame Figaro, and French Numéro. Kass's first Vogue cover was French Vogue in November 1997.

 
Her career was launched by Anna Wintour, and by 1999, Kass was walking the runway for numerous and diverse top designers, such as Marc Jacobs, Michael Kors, Calvin Klein, Ralph Lauren, Donna Karan, and Dolce & Gabbana; and posing in advertisements for designers and brands, like Calvin Klein, Chanel, Gucci, Donna Karan, Dsquared2, Versace, Givenchy, Fendi, Max Mara, Valentino, Ralph Lauren, Narciso Rodriguez, and even General Motors.  She also appeared in a Gap denim advertising campaign, and was a spokesperson for Revlon cosmetics, Sephora, and the Christian Dior perfume, J'adore.  In 2007 alone, Kass booked ten campaigns with notable designers for Spring/Summer collections. From 2007 onwards, she became the model and spokesperson for Max Factor.

Kass was the muse of Michael Kors, and the face of the brand for 10 consecutive years. Kass has been also the spokesperson of the Narciso Rodriguez For Her perfume and several of its editions for 17 consecutive years to date.

Kass was named "Model of the Year" at the 2000 VH1/Vogue Fashion Awards. In the year 2002, she was estimated to have been the second-highest-paid model in the world. She is well-known for her distinctive runway walk in the fashion industry. Despite her height, her feet are relatively small (about an American size seven).

She opened and closed the Victoria's Secret Fashion Show in 1999, and also walked for the brand in 2000, 2002, 2003, and 2008.

She is considered to be one of the models who ended the heroin chic era along with Gisele Bündchen.

Film
While living in New York, she attended the Lee Strasberg Institute. In 2004, Kass played the female lead in the Estonian murder-mystery film Täna öösel me ei maga ("We Won't Sleep Tonight"; titled "Set Point" in the international release). She also had a cameo appearance in the film Zoolander, where she played herself opening the Derelicte fashion show.

Politics
In February 2004, she joined Estonia's ruling Res Publica Party. Kass ran for the European Parliament after her homeland joined the European Union in May 2004.  She won 2,315 votes from the Estonian electorate, but was not elected to the European Parliament.

Chess 
Kass is a keen chess player. She was elected president of the Estonian Chess Federation for 8 consecutive years and currently serves as a councillor. She ran a campaign for Tallinn to host the 2008 Chess Olympics; however, Dresden, Germany was chosen instead.

Business
She is part owner of her mother agency, Baltic Models. In Estonia, Kass owns some private companies, including two real estate companies.

Personal life
From 2004 until 2014, Kass was in a relationship with Eric Lobron, a German chess grandmaster.

She is fluent in Estonian and English and is conversant in Russian and Italian.

Her nephew, Antonio Sebastian Kass, is also a model and a musician.

References

External links 

1978 births
Living people
Estonian female models
Estonian female chess players
Estonian women in business
Estonian film actresses
Lee Strasberg Theatre and Film Institute alumni
Res Publica Party politicians
Politicians from Tallinn
Sportspeople from Tallinn
21st-century Estonian actresses
21st-century Estonian politicians
Women Management models
21st-century Estonian women politicians